Oleksandr Valeriyovych Nikiforov (born 18 October 1967) is a former Ukrainian professional footballer.

Club career
He made his professional debut in the Soviet First League in 1985 for FC Dynamo Stavropol. He played 1 game in the UEFA Cup 1990–91 for FC Chornomorets Odesa.

Personal life
He is the older brother of the former CIS/Ukraine/Russia international footballer Yuri Nikiforov.

Honours
 USSR Federation Cup winner: 1990.
 Ukrainian Premier League runner-up: 1995.
 Ukrainian Premier League bronze: 1993, 1994.

References

1967 births
Footballers from Odesa
Living people
Soviet footballers
Soviet expatriate footballers
Ukrainian footballers
Ukrainian expatriate footballers
Association football midfielders
Expatriate footballers in Hungary
Soviet expatriate sportspeople in Hungary
Ukrainian expatriate sportspeople in Hungary
Expatriate footballers in Russia
Ukrainian expatriate sportspeople in Russia
FC Dynamo Stavropol players
SC Odesa players
FC Chornomorets Odesa players
Budapesti VSC footballers
FC KAMAZ Naberezhnye Chelny players
MFC Mykolaiv players
MTK Budapest FC players
Soviet Top League players
Ukrainian Premier League players
Russian Premier League players